National Rally for Democracy may refer to:

 National Rally for Democracy (Algeria)
 National Rally for Democracy (Mali)
 National Democratic Rally (Senegal)
 National Rally for Democracy (Benin)